Bernard Tomic was the defending champion. He reached the semifinals, where he lost 3–6, 7–6(7–3), 6–7(5–7) to Chris Guccione.
Guccione withdrew before his match against Flavio Cipolla in the final. As a result, Cipolla won the tournament.

Seeds

Draw

Finals

Top half

Bottom half

References
Main Draw
Qualifying Singles

McDonald's Burnie International - Men's Singles
2011 Singles
2011 in Australian tennis